Melvin Lobo (born 27 February 1992) is an Indian professional footballer who plays as a defender for DSK Shivajians in the I-League.

Career
Born in Assolna, Goa, Lobo began his career at the Sesa Football Academy. He played senior football for the side in the Goa Professional League and the Durand Cup. Lobo also represented the Goa football team during the Santosh Trophy in 2013.

DSK Shivajians
In 2014, Lobo signed with DSK Shivajians and played for the club in various competitions and the Pune Super Division. On 26 January 2016, Lobo made his professional debut for the club in the I-League against East Bengal. He played the full-match as DSK Shivajians lost 1–0.

Professional career statistics

References

External links 
 DSK Shivajians Profile.

1992 births
Living people
People from South Goa district
Indian footballers
DSK Shivajians FC players
Association football defenders
Footballers from Goa
Goa Professional League players
I-League players